Livoberezhna is a station on the Kyiv Metro's Sviatoshynsko-Brovarska Line.The station was opened on 5 November 1965, as part of the eastward expansion of the Brovary radius and is the first one to be fully on the left bank of the Dnieper River (hence its name).

The station is situated at a junction between the Brovary Avenue and the Rayisa Okipna Street, and is actually above ground level with the platform being on the flyover. Two vestibules are on ground level with exits on the southern side of the station. Thereby passengers have to ascend to reach the Metro.

Designed by architects I. Maslenkov, and V. Bogdanovsky, the station features a standard Kyivan surface level design that is almost identical to both of its neighbours and is fully reminiscent of the 1960s policy on Soviet public architecture—a single platform with one hinged concrete roof supported by light blue tiled pillars, with decorative flower ceramics at the top.

The station serves the Livoberezhna microdistrict, as well as many of the northern adjacent districts, commuters from which use urban transport to arrive. In the prospective future, the station shall be a future transfer to a planned line, Livoberezhna.

Eurovision Song Contest 2017 

On 17 February 2017, the station was temporarily closed, due to the reconstruction to the Eurovision Song Contest. On 23 March, the renovated eastern vestibule was opened, which was radically different from the earlier sketches. Many Kyivans were dissatisfied with the repairs carried out. The finally restored station was opened on 5 May.

Gallery

References

External links
 Kyiv Metro Official website - Station description
 Unofficial Kyiv Metro website - Description and photo gallery
Google maps - Satellite shot
 metro.zarohem.cz - Photo gallery

Kyiv Metro stations
Railway stations opened in 1965
Dniprovskyi District, Kyiv
1965 establishments in Ukraine